Solanum incompletum is a rare species of flowering plant in the family Solanaceae known by the common names thorny popolo and popolo ku mai (popolo being a term for any Solanum species and similar berry-bearing plants). It is endemic to Hawaii, where it occurs today on the islands of Maui, Lanai, and Hawaii. It is threatened by the destruction and degradation of its habitat. It is a federally listed endangered species of the United States.

This plant is a shrub growing up to 3 meters tall. Its stems and leaves are covered in large red prickles, and it bears star-shaped white flowers. The plant grows in forest and shrubland habitat, and cinder cone habitat on Hawaii.

The species is extirpated from the islands of Kauai and Molokai. It was feared extirpated from Hawaii until a small population was discovered there in recent years. Now there are 83 individuals estimated on that island. Several have been outplanted into appropriate habitat.

The plant is threatened by feral ungulates such as feral pigs, feral goats, and Mouflon. The invasion of introduced species of plants such as Pennisetum setaceum (fountain grass) and Kalanchoe tubiflora (chandelier plant) degrades the habitat. The plants also appear to have trouble reproducing, as evidenced by low seed production, perhaps due to extinction of their preferred pollinators.

References

incompletum
Endemic flora of Hawaii
Plants described in 1852